Brian Hartley (born 18 October 1937) is a South African cricketer. He played in nine first-class matches for Border in 1962/63 and 1963/64.

See also
 List of Border representative cricketers

References

External links
 

1937 births
Living people
South African cricketers
Border cricketers
Sportspeople from Dordrecht